The Star mansion (星宿, pinyin: Xīng Xiù) is one of the Twenty-eight mansions of the Chinese constellations.  It is one of the southern mansions of the Vermilion Bird.

Asterisms

References 

Chinese constellations